Araks, is a village with 2,113 inhabitants (2001) in the western part of the Armavir Province of Armenia. It was founded as a state farm in 1940. The Battle of Sardarapat of 1918, took place near the village of Araks. In 1968, the Sardarapat Battle Memorial was erected on the site of the battle. Additionally there is the state owned Armenia Ethnography Museum.

References 

Populated places in Armavir Province
Populated places established in 1940
Cities and towns built in the Soviet Union
Yazidi populated places in Armenia